The 1888 World Championship was an exhibition football match that took place in Crosshill (today part of Glasgow), Scotland, on 19 May 1888 between the winners of the Scottish Cup, Renton, and the English FA Cup, West Bromwich Albion. The match was won by Renton who beat Albion 4–1. The match was played in very bad weather and a replay in England was proposed, but never took place.

Overview 
This was not the first "World Championship" game between English and Scottish sides; however, the next edition was the first such club competition contested between national league winners (as the leagues had not been yet created before that time). Johnny Campbell, who played for Renton in this fixture, would also win a world championship with Sunderland in 1895; he is therefore the first known British footballer to have been twice listed as a world champion with different clubs.

It was noted in the press that West Brom were "one of the English clubs which have never had a Scotchman either as a coach or a player" and the match were therefore seen as a truly international event – by this point may of the leading English clubs (which were allowed to become professional in 1885) had Scottish players, and in the aforementioned Sunderland v Hearts match in 1895 both entrants had an all-Scottish line-up.

Renton's win was something of a watershed for Scottish football, as within a few days James Kelly and Neil McCallum had left to join the newly-formed Celtic and quickly helped to establish them as a force in the game, Meanwhile Renton soon lost several other members of their 'world champion' team to professional clubs in England (including Andrew Hannah who moved to West Brom after he impressed them in the Glasgow match) and gradually declined, never returning to the same level.

Participant teams

Match details

Teams

References

1887–88 in English football
1887–88 in Scottish football
World
World
May 1888 sports events
International association football competitions hosted by Scotland